The Commonwealth Aircraft Corporation (CAC) was an Australian aircraft manufacturer. The CAC was established in 1936, to provide Australia with the capability to produce military aircraft and engines.

History
In 1935 the Chief General Manager of BHP, Essington Lewis, visited Europe and formed the view that war was probable. On his return to Australia, concerned at the lack of manufacturing capabilities there and at the possibility of aircraft not being available from 'traditional' (i.e. British) sources during wartime, he commenced a lobbying campaign to convince the Government of Australia to establish a modern aircraft industry. The government required little persuasion and encouraged negotiations between a number of Australian companies. The outcome of these negotiations, begun in August 1935, was the formation of CAC the following year. Initially the companies involved were BHP, General Motors-Holden and Broken Hill Associated Smelter. These were joined by Imperial Chemical Industries, the Orient Steam Navigation Company and the Electrolytic Zinc Company. at the time of CAC's formation (the company was incorporated in Melbourne on 17 October 1936). By September 1937 a factory had been completed at Port Melbourne.

Shortly after the establishment of CAC, Mascot-based Tugan Aircraft was purchased. This led to Lawrence Wackett joining the company; he immediately became the General Manager. It is almost entirely due to Wackett's efforts that the Wirraway became the first aircraft produced by CAC. In 1935 Wackett had led a technical mission to Europe and the United States to evaluate modern aircraft types and select a type suitable to Australia's needs and within Australia's capabilities to build. The mission's selection was the North American NA-16; with CAC's modifications this became the Wirraway. CAC also undertook production of the Pratt & Whitney R-1340 engine used in the Wirraway and also built some propellers when supplies from alternative sources became problematic. With its first aircraft type the company thus became one of very few in the world that have produced an aircraft fitted with engines and propellers made by the same company (see also de Havilland).

While CAC largely produced Australian versions of foreign aircraft, it also developed a number of original designs during and after World War II. These indigenous designs include the Wackett, which was only the second type produced by the company. The Wackett was a simple trainer aircraft, but later designs during World War II were the sophisticated Woomera and CA-15, however these types were destined to fly only in prototype form. Other, jet-powered aircraft designs in the 1950s and 1960s did not even leave the drawing board, however in 1951 CAC was given the go-ahead to design and manufacture a version of the F-86 Sabre with a revised engine and armament. The Sabre was developed and produced concurrently with the indigenous Winjeel trainer, with Sabre manufacture coming to an end in 1961.

In 1964 after a large amount of political lobbying CAC began producing components for the Sabre's replacement, a version of the Dassault Mirage III, as a subcontractor to the Government Aircraft Factories (GAF). In 1967 CAC commenced licence production of a version of the Aermacchi MB-326 optimised for Australian conditions, this programme ended in 1972. In 1971 CAC joined the small number of aircraft manufacturers which have built both fixed- and rotary-winged aircraft, when it began production of a variant of the Bell Kiowa for the Australian Army and Royal Australian Navy, the last of these was delivered in 1977. The same year CAC embarked on a Life Of Type Extension (LOTEX) programme for the Macchi, which was suffering fatigue problems. The LOTEX programme lasted until 1984. The CAC became a fully owned subsidiary of Hawker de Havilland in 1985 and was renamed Hawker de Havilland Victoria Limited in 1986. This company was purchased by Boeing Australia in 2000.

CAC produced an extremely wide range of aircraft for the Royal Australian Air Force and civilian operators. These aircraft included the:
 CAC CA-1, CA-3, CA-5, CA-7, CA-8, CA-9, CA-16 Wirraway (trainer and general purposes aircraft)
 CAC CA-2, CA-6 Wackett Trainer (trainer)
 CAC CA-12, CA-13, CA-14, CA-19 Boomerang (fighter)
 CAC CA-11 Woomera (prototype medium bomber)
 CAC CA-17 Mustang Mk.20, CA-18 Mk.21/22/23, CA-21 Mk.24 (fighter, North American P-51 Mustang)
 CAC CA-15 "Kangaroo" (prototype fighter)
 CAC CA-28 Ceres (crop duster)
 CAC CA-22, CA-25 Winjeel (trainer)
 CAC CA-26, CA-27 Avon-Sabre (fighter)
 CAC CA-30 Macchi MB-326H (trainer)
 CAC CA-32 / Bell 206B Kiowa (light observation helicopter)

The Kiowa was the last type built by CAC. The company was part of the Australian Aircraft Consortium which designed the A10 Wamira, but this programme was cancelled in 1985 shortly after the prototype was completed. At the time of purchase by Hawker de Havilland, CAC had begun delivering components for the GAF-built version of the F/A-18 Hornet.

Aircraft design and production

During its existence the Commonwealth Aircraft Corporation produced over 1700 aircraft of all types, including prototypes and aircraft assembled locally from imported components. Of these, almost 550 were examples of aircraft types wholly designed by the company. The designations used by CAC reflected production or design work in fulfillment of different in-house projects or government contracts rather than different types produced (for instance the different designations for the Wackett and Winjeel prototypes compared to their production versions). Early types were given consecutive manufacturer's construction numbers (c/nos.), while later types (beginning with the production version of the Winjeel) were given c/nos. with the model number as a prefix. Construction numbers 1210 to 1224 appear not to have been assigned. The list of company designations and construction numbers is:

 CA-1 First Wirraway production contract; 40 built (c/nos. 1–40)
 CA-2 Wackett prototypes; two built (c/nos. 101, 102)
 CA-3 Second Wirraway production contract; 60 built (c/nos. 41–100)
 CA-4 Woomera prototype; one built (c/no. 435)
 CA-5 Third Wirraway production contract; 32 built (c/nos. 103–134)
 CA-6 Wackett production contract; 200 built (c/nos. 235–434)
 CA-7 Fourth Wirraway production contract; 100 built (c/nos. 135–234)
 CA-8 Fifth Wirraway production contract; 200 built (c/nos. 436–635)
 CA-9 Sixth Wirraway production contract; 188 built (c/nos. 636–823)
 CA-10 Proposed Wirraway variant not built (see CAC Wirraway for CA-10A)
 CA-11 Woomera production contract for 105 aircraft. Contract cancelled, only one aircraft flew (101 c/nos. assigned, 1225–1325)
 CA-12 First Boomerang production contract; 105 built (c/nos. 824–928)
 CA-13 Second Boomerang production contract; 95 built (c/nos. 929–1023)
 CA-14 Experimental Boomerang fitted with turbocharger; one built (c/no. 1074).
 CA-15 Single-seat fighter; one built (c/n 1073).
 CA-16 Seventh (and final) Wirraway production contract; 135 built (c/nos. 1075–1209)
 CA-17 First Mustang production contract; 80 assembled from imported components (c/nos. 1326–1405, 1326–1345 also assigned North American c/nos. NA110-34366 to -34385)
 CA-18 Second Mustang production contract; 120 built, production of a further 50 cancelled (c/nos. 1406–1525).
 CA-19 Third (and final) Boomerang production contract; 49 built (c/nos. 1024–1072)
 CA-20 Contract to modify Wirraways for use by the RAN (see CAC Wirraway); 17 modified
 CA-21 Third (and final) Mustang production contract for 100 aircraft; contract cancelled, none built
 CA-22 Winjeel prototypes; two built (c/nos. 1526, 1527)
 CA-23 Designation of a two-seat twin-engined supersonic jet fighter design. None built but extensive design work undertaken (see CAC CA-23)
 CA-24 Contract for production of 72 of variant of the Hawker P.1081; none built
 CA-25 Winjeel production contract; 62 built (c/nos. CA25-1 to -62)
 CA-26 Sabre prototype; one built (c/no. 1528).
 CA-27 Sabre production contract; 111 built (c/nos. CA27-1 to -111)
 CA-28 Ceres production, built as private venture; 21 built (c/nos. CA28-1 to -21)
 CA-29 Production sub-contract for wings, fins, rudders, tailcones and engines of GAF-built variant of Mirage IIIE; 101 airframe shipsets and 140 engines built
 CA-30 Macchi production contract; 20 assembled from imported components plus 77 built (c/nos. CA30-1 to -97, CA30-1 to -13 and -15 to -21 also assigned non-consecutive Aermacchi c/nos. between 6351 and 6395)
 CA-31 Jet trainer design; none built (Macchi built instead).
 CA-32 Kiowa production contract; 12 assembled from imported components plus 44 built (c/nos. CA32-13 to -56, all 56 aircraft also assigned Bell c/nos. 44501-44556)
 CA-33 Contract for modifications to the RAAF fleet of Lockheed P-3C Orions; installing the Barra Sonobuoy system (developed for the RAAF and Royal Air Force by the Defence Science & Organisation (DSTO)) and associated systems after delivery of each aircraft from the USA; 20 aircraft modified (contract completed as HdHV)
 CA-34 Designation used for CAC's participation in the A10 Wamira project
 CA-35 Contract for modifications to a Fokker F27 Friendship (registration VH-EWP) to install the LADS system developed by the DSTO (contract completed as HdHV)
 CA-36 Production sub-contract for the wing pylons, engine access panels, aft nozzle fairings, aircraft-mounted accessory drive gearboxes and engines for the GAF-built version of the F/A-18 Hornet; 73 airframe shipsets and 158 complete engines built, plus parts of another 17 engines (contract completed as HdHV)

Aero-engine production

Engine types produced by CAC include the:

 Pratt & Whitney R-1340 Wasp built for the Wirraway
 Pratt & Whitney R-1830 Twin Wasp built for the Boomerang, Woomera and DAP Beaufort
 Rolls-Royce Merlin built for the GAF Lincoln
 Rolls-Royce Nene built for versions of the de Havilland Vampire manufactured by de Havilland Australia
 Rolls-Royce Avon built for the Sabre and GAF Canberra
 Snecma Atar built for the Mirage
 Bristol Siddeley Viper built for the Macchi MB-326H
 General Electric F404 built for versions of the McDonnell Douglas F/A-18 Hornet manufactured by the Government Aircraft Factories/Aerospace Technologies of Australia

Bus body building
To supplement revenue and retain skilled sheet metal workers, CAC produced and bodied buses based on Bedford chassis under the brand name of Comair. CAC major shareholder in the 1950s was General Motors Holden and from 1946 until 1973, Comair produced over 3,600 bus bodies, primarily on Bedford OB, SB and VAM 70 chassis for Victorian operators. Subsequently, General Motors Holden divested its shareholding in CAC and the company signed a licensing agreement to build VöV-Standard-Bus bodies on MAN chassis. It bodied 135 MAN SL200 chassis for ACTION. It resumed production on Bedford chassis in 1977, but only a few were produced.

See also
 Fred David
 Laurence Hartnett

References

Notes

Bibliography
 Chapman, John; Goodall, Geoff & Coggan, Paul. Warbirds Worldwide Directory: An International Survey of the World's Warbird Population. Warbirds Worldwide Ltd. 
 Bell, Dana ed. The Smithsonian National Air and Space Museum Directory of Airplanes, Their Designers and Manufacturers. Smithsonian Institution. 
 Boeing Australia Commonwealth Aircraft Corporation – History
 Meggs, Keith. The Commonwealth Aircraft Corporation
 Wilson, Stewart. Spitfire, Mustang and Kittyhawk in Australian Service. Aerospace Publications Pty Ltd 
 Wilson, Stewart. Meteor, Sabre and Mirage in Australian Service. Aerospace Publications Pty Ltd 
 Wilson, Stewart. Catalina, Neptune and Orion in Australian Service. Aerospace Publications Pty Ltd 
 Wilson, Stewart. Wirraway, Boomerang & CA-15 in Australian Service. Aerospace Publications Pty Ltd 
 Wilson, Stewart. Phantom, Hornet and Skyhawk in Australian Service. Aerospace Publications Pty Ltd 
 Wilson, Stewart. Vampire, Macchi and Iroquois in Australian Service. Aerospace Publications Pty Ltd 
 Wilson, Stewart. Tiger Moth, CT-4, Wackett & Winjeel in Australian Service. Aerospace Publications Pty Ltd 
 Wilson, Stewart. Military Aircraft of Australia. Aerospace Publications Pty Ltd

External links

 ADF Serials

Australian military aviation
Bus manufacturers of Australia
Defence companies of Australia
Defunct aircraft manufacturers of Australia
Defunct manufacturing companies of Australia
Former Commonwealth Government-owned companies of Australia
Former defence companies
Manufacturing plants in Melbourne
Military history of Australia during World War II
Vehicle manufacturing companies established in 1936
Vehicle manufacturing companies disestablished in 1985
1936 establishments in Australia
1985 disestablishments in Australia